The 2019 ARCA Pensacola 200 presented by Inspectra Thermal Solutions was the second stock car race of the 2019 ARCA Menards Series season and the 6th iteration of the event. The race was held on Saturday, March 9, 2019, in Pensacola, Florida, at Five Flags Speedway, a  paved oval-shaped racetrack. The race took the scheduled 200 laps to complete. At race's end, Michael Self of Venturini Motorsports would take the lead from Kaden Honeycutt in the late stages of the race to take home his fourth ARCA Menards Series win and his first of the season. To fill out the podium, Ty Gibbs of Joe Gibbs Racing and Christian Eckes of Venturini Motorsports would finish second and third, respectively.

Background 
Five Flags Speedway is a paved half mile (0.8 km) auto racing oval in Pensacola, Florida, United States. It opened in 1953 and is located on Pine Forest Road. It is christened after the nickname of Pensacola—"City of Five Flags."

It runs several local classes during the regular racing season (March – October). These classes include Super Late Models, Pro Late Models, Pro Trucks, Outlaw Stocks, Sportsman, and Pure Stocks. The races are usual held on Friday nights bi-weekly. The track has also hosted many regional touring series.

Entry list

Practice 
The only 90-minute practice session was held on Saturday, March 9, at 1:00 PM EST.

Qualifying 
Qualifying was held on Saturday, March 9, at 4:30 PM EST. Each driver would have two laps to set a fastest time; the fastest of the two would count as their official qualifying lap.

Full qualifying results

Race results

References 

2019 ARCA Menards Series
March 2019 sports events in the United States
2019 in sports in Florida